6th San Francisco Film Awards
December 11, 2007

Best Picture: 
 The Assassination of Jesse James by the Coward Robert Ford 
The 6th San Francisco Film Critics Circle Awards, honoring the best in film for 2007, were given on 10 December 2007.

Winners

Best Picture:
The Assassination of Jesse James by the Coward Robert Ford
Best Director: 
Joel and Ethan Coen - No Country for Old Men
Best Original Screenplay: 
The Savages - Tamara Jenkins
Best Adapted Screenplay: 
Away from Her - Sarah Polley
Best Actor: 
George Clooney - Michael Clayton
Best Actress:
Julie Christie - Away from Her
Best Supporting Actor: 
Casey Affleck - The Assassination of Jesse James by the Coward Robert Ford
Best Supporting Actress: 
Amy Ryan - Gone Baby Gone
Best Foreign Language Film: 
The Diving Bell and the Butterfly (Le scaphandre et le papillon) • France/United States
Best Documentary:
No End in Sight
Marlon Riggs Award (for courage & vision in the Bay Area film community): 
Lynn Hershman Leeson
Special Citation:
Colma: The Musical

External links
2007 San Francisco Film Critics Circle Awards

References
'Jesse James,' Clooney, Christie, Coens get S.F. critics awards

San Francisco Film Critics Circle Awards
2007 film awards